The Detroit Lions are a professional American football team based in Detroit, Michigan.  They are currently a member of the North Division of the National Football Conference (NFC) in the National Football League (NFL).  The franchise has had 30 head coaches in team history, which includes its existence as the Portsmouth (Ohio) Spartans (1930–1933). In the 1934 NFL season, the franchise moved to Detroit and changed their name to the Lions.

George "Potsy" Clark is the only coach to have more than one tenure. Three coaches have won NFL championships with the team: Potsy Clark in 1935, Buddy Parker in 1952 and 1953, and George Wilson in 1957.  Wayne Fontes is the all-time leader in games coached and wins, and Clark leads all coaches in winning percentage with .679 (with at least one full season coached). John Karcis is statistically the worst coach the Lions have had as he never won a game. Karcis is followed by Marty Mornhinweg with a winning percentage of .156.

Of the 29 Lions coaches, two have been elected into the Pro Football Hall of Fame: Dutch Clark and Joe Schmidt.  Gus Dorais was inducted in the College Football Hall of Fame as a coach in 1954. Several former players have been head coach for the Lions, including Dutch Edwards, Buddy Parker, Harry Gilmer, Joe Schmidt, and Dick Jauron. The current head coach is Dan Campbell, who was hired on January 20, 2021.

Coaches 
Note: Statistics are accurate through week 15 of the 2022 NFL season.

Notes

References

External links
 
 
 
 
 
 

 
Detroit Lions
Head coaches